Kaya is a department or commune of Sanmatenga Province in central Burkina Faso. Its capital is the town of Kaya.

Towns and villages

 Sanrgo

References

Departments of Burkina Faso
Sanmatenga Province